Pompeiu Lazăr (born 1906, date of death unknown) was a Romanian football goalkeeper.

International career
Pompeiu Lazăr played one game at international level for Romania in a 1927 friendly which ended with a 3–0 loss against Yugoslavia. He was also part of Romania's 1924 Summer Olympics squad.

References

1906 births
Year of death missing
Romanian footballers
Romania international footballers
Footballers at the 1924 Summer Olympics
Place of birth missing
Association football goalkeepers
FC Universitatea Cluj players